Calf Creek Plateau is a mountain in the northern San Juan Mountains of the Rocky Mountains of North America.

Geology
Calf Creek Plateau is within the San Juan volcanic field and volcanic rocks dominate the region. The mountain itself is composed of basaltic lava flows of the Hinsdale Formation, which are dated as 16 to 19 million years old. These lava flows are thought to be among the last volcanic events in the area and are some of the best preserved. The Hinsdale Formation lava flows form an expansive alpine highland where the two highest ridges are Calf Creek Plateau and nearby Cannibal Plateau. Calf Creek Plateau was glaciated, and the most prominent glacial cirques are located on the north side of the plateau. Powderhorn Lakes, a popular hiking destination, are located in one of these cirques.

Hiking

The easiest route to the summit starts at the Powderhorn Lakes Trailhead located at the northern edge of the wilderness area. The Powderhorn Lakes Trail can be taken southwest . At the large subalpine meadow where the trail turns southeast toward Powderhorn Lakes, leave the trail and continue  up the ridge through meadows and eventually alpine tundra to the broad summit. The views along this alpine hike are expansive.

Calf Creek Plateau can also be reached from the Devil’s Creek Trailhead to the west and the Deer Lakes, Brush Creek, and Powderhorn Park trailheads to the south. All these routes begin in subalpine forests before emerging into the scenic alpine landscape of the Powderhorn Wilderness.

References

External links
 

Landforms of Hinsdale County, Colorado
Mountains of Colorado